Anthony Barton (Tony) Underhill was an Australian artist born in Sydney in 1923.

Underhill joined the Australian Army in 1941. During this time he met William Dobell who taught him art and he completed his training with Dobell at the Sydney Technical College from 1945-46. He was a semi-official War Artist in New Guinea and North Australia from 1942-43. He had his first solo show in Melbourne in 1947, then moved to England the following year. He taught at Hornsey and Guildford Colleges of Art and became head of post-graduate painting at Birmingham Polytechnic. His works are held by the Art Gallery of New South Wales.

Underhill died in London on 24 May 1977.

References

1923 births
1977 deaths
Australian expatriates in the United Kingdom
Artists from Sydney
Australian Army personnel of World War II